Acalitus ferrugineum is a species of eriophyid mite. This microscopic organism induces erineum galls on the leaves of American beech, and is known from the United States and Canada.

Description of the gall 
Leaves affected by this species of mite will present with pale or light yellow erineum patches which progress into a reddish-brown later in the season. These galls are not known to have any consequences on the health of the tree beyond aesthetics.

References 

Eriophyidae
Animals described in 1885